Chamkaisi Chindi Udaysi is a 2009 Indian Kannada-language comedy film directed by A. R. Babu and starring Komal and Nidhi Subbaiah. The film is an  unofficial remake of the Hindi film Deewane Huye Paagal (2005), which itself is based on the English film There's Something About Mary (1998).

The film was released on 3 July 2009 alongside Kabaddi (2009).

Cast 
Komal as ‘Bottu’ Seena
Nidhi Subbaiah as Kamala
Kiran as Ganesh
Shobharaj as Don Janny
Dharma as Pratap
Rahul
Giri Dinesh
Umashree
Mukhyamantri Chandru
R. N. Sudarshan

Production 
The scenes involving Komal on a jet ski were shot in Thailand.

Reception 
A critic from Mid-Day wrote that "If comedy is what you are seeking, then this movie will  you". A critic from Bangalore Mirror opined that "Chamkaisi Chindi Udyasi is a hotchpotch of various Hindi and English films garnished with stale jokes". A critic from Filmibeat noted that "It is not director's movie, but it is of Komal Kumar, who rocks the audience all through movie. He tries to win the show with his mannerism, when dialogues fail". Critic R. G. Vijayasarathy stated that "'Chamakaayisi...' has many loopholes but it is worth a watch for the entertaining dialogues".

References

External links 

Kannada remakes of Hindi films
Indian remakes of American films